Wiktor Malinowski (born 2 August 1994) is a Polish professional poker player who focuses on mid to high stakes online no limit hold 'em (NLHE) cash games. He transitioned to the live poker tournament scene in 2019. He formerly played handball professionally.

Career
Malinowski started playing  poker seriously in 2014. He began playing freerolls and the lowest stakes offered for online cash games. Over the  next two years, he managed to become a regular at mid to high stakes online cash games playing under the alias "limitless". In 2018, he won the World Championship of Online Poker $25K High Roller Turbo, winning $726,000 in the process.

While on Joey Ingram's podcast, Malinowski offered a "heads-up challenge to anyone, playing while drunk". In June 2020, Malinowski won the partypoker High Roller Club $25,500 Main Event winning $443,750 in the process.

In August 2020, Malinowski won a $842,438 pot from Michael Addamo while playing NLHE on the poker site Natural8. It became the largest online pot in NLHE history beating the previous record of $723,938 won by Di Dang against Tom Dwan in 2008. The record was beaten just a few days later when Bosnian-born poker player Almedin “Ali” Imsirovic won a pot worth $974,631 while playing NLHE online. Approximately one week later Malinowski won another pot worth $500,146 holding  for a wheel.

In 2021, he won the first place prize of $3,690,000 at the Super High Roller Bowl Europe held in North Cyprus Turkish Repuclic (North Cyprus) becoming No. 2 on Poland's all-time money list.

As of September 2021, Malinowski's total live tournament winnings exceed $4,300,000.

See also
List of Poles

References

External links
 Wiktor Malinowski Hendon Mob tournament results

1994 births
Living people
Polish poker players